René Muñiz (23 October 1932 – 12 May 2008) was a Mexican swimmer. He competed in the men's 100 metre freestyle at the 1952 Summer Olympics.

References

External links
 

1932 births
2008 deaths
Mexican male swimmers
Olympic swimmers of Mexico
Swimmers at the 1952 Summer Olympics
Place of birth missing